Armin Bošnjak (born 20 April 1994) is a Montenegrin professional footballer who plays as a forward for Singaporean side Tampines Rovers.

On October 1 2021, Bošnjak announced his departure from Tampines Rovers.

Career statistics

Club

Notes

References

1994 births
Living people
Association football forwards
Montenegrin footballers
Montenegrin expatriate footballers
FK Jedinstvo Bijelo Polje players
FK Iskra Danilovgrad players
FK Rudar Pljevlja players
FK Zeta players
Tampines Rovers FC players
Montenegrin Second League players
Montenegrin First League players
Singapore Premier League players
Expatriate footballers in Kosovo
Montenegrin expatriate sportspeople in Kosovo
Expatriate footballers in Singapore
Montenegrin expatriate sportspeople in Singapore
Bosniaks of Montenegro